Thomas Joseph "Red" Martin  (July 5, 1938 – July 27, 2017) was an American ice hockey player who competed in the 1964 Winter Olympics. In 1964 he participated with the American ice hockey team in the Winter Olympics tournament. Martin later founded Cramer, a brand experience agency.

Awards and honors

See also
 List of Olympic men's ice hockey players for the United States

References

External links

1938 births
2017 deaths
Ice hockey people from Boston
Olympic ice hockey players of the United States
Ice hockey players at the 1964 Winter Olympics
Boston College Eagles men's ice hockey players
American men's ice hockey defensemen
Boston College Eagles baseball players
AHCA Division I men's ice hockey All-Americans